The 518th Air Defense Group  is a disbanded United States Air Force organization. Its last assignment was with the 4707th Air Defense Wing, stationed at Niagara Falls Municipal Airport, New York, where it was inactivated in 1955.

The group was originally activated as a support unit for the 465th Bombardment Group at the end of World War II in Italy and then redeployed to the Caribbean, where it supported redeploying units until it was inactivated in 1945.

The group was activated once again in 1953, when ADC established it as the headquarters for a dispersed fighter-interceptor squadron and the medical, maintenance, and administrative squadrons supporting it.  It was replaced in 1955 when ADC transferred its mission, equipment, and personnel to the 15th Fighter Group in a project that replaced air defense groups commanding fighter squadrons with fighter groups with distinguished records during World War II.

History

World War II
The group was activated shortly before the end of World War II as the 518th Air Service Group in Italy in early 1945 as part of a reorganization of Army Air Forces (AAF) support groups in which the AAF replaced Service Groups that included personnel from other branches of the Army and supported two combat groups with Air Service Groups including only Air Corps units.  It was designed to support a single combat group. Its 944th Air Engineering Squadron provided maintenance that was beyond the capability of the combat group, its 768th Air Materiel Squadron handled all supply matters, and its Headquarters & Base Services Squadron provided other support. The unit supported the 465th Bombardment Group in Italy. The group moved to the Caribbean and provided support for flying units redeploying from Europe to the United States. It was disbanded in 1948.

Cold War
During the Cold War, the 518th group was reconstituted, redesignated as an air defense group, and activated at Niagara Falls Municipal Airport in 1953 with responsibility for air defense of Niagara Falls, Toronto, Western and upper New York area. It was assigned the 47th Fighter-Interceptor Squadron (FIS), which was already stationed at Niagara Falls, and flying World War II era Republic F-47 Thunderbolts as its operational component. The 47th FIS had been assigned to the 4708th Defense Wing. It was assigned three squadrons to perform its support responsibilities. It converted the same month to jet propelled North American F-86 Sabre aircraft.

The 47th FIS upgraded to a later airborne intercept radar equipped and Mighty Mouse rocket armed version of the "Sabre" in September 1953, but its replacement aircraft were not delivered until early 1954. The group replaced 76th Air Base Squadron as the active duty USAF host unit at Niagara Falls Municipal Airport.   The group was replaced by the 15th Fighter Group (Air Defense) in 1955 as part of Air Defense Command's Project Arrow, which was designed to bring back on the active list the fighter units which had compiled memorable records in the two world wars. The 518th group was disbanded once again in 1984.

Lineage
 Constituted as 518th Air Service Group
 Activated on 25 January 1945
 Inactivated on 31 July 1945
 Disbanded on 8 October 1948
 Reconstituted and redesignated 518th Air Defense Group on 21 January 1953
 Activated on 16 February 1953
 Inactivated on 18 August 1955
 Disbanded on 27 September 1984

Assignments
 XV Air Force Service Command 25 Jan 1945 – 1945
 Caribbean Division, Air Transport Command 1945 – 31 July 1945
 4707th Defense Wing (later 4707th Air Defense Wing), 16 February 1953 – 18 August 1955

Stations
 Pantanella Airfield, Italy, 25 January 1945 – 27 May 1945
 Bagnoli Staging Area, Italy, 27 May 1945 – 6 June 1945
 Waller Field, Trinidad 15 June 1945 – 31 July 1945
 Niagara Falls Municipal Airport, New York, 16 February 1953 – 18 August 1955

Components
Operational Squadron
 47th Fighter-Interceptor Squadron, 16 February 1953 – 18 August 1955

Support Units
 518th Air Base Squadron, 16 February 1953 – 18 August 1955
 518th Materiel Squadron, 16 February 1953 – 18 August 1955
 518th Medical Squadron (later 518th USAF Infirmary), 16 February 1953 – 18 August 1955
 768th Air Materiel Squadron, 25 January 1945 – 31 July 1945
 944th Air Engineering Squadron, 25 January 1945 – 31 July 1945

Aircraft
 F-47D, 1953
 F-86A, 1953-1954
 F-86D, 1954-1955

Commanders
 Lt Col Lloyd L. Connell, 1 January 1945 – 1945

See also
 List of United States Air Force Aerospace Defense Command Interceptor Squadrons
 List of F-86 Sabre units

References

Notes

Bibliography

 Buss, Lydus H.(ed), Sturm, Thomas A., Volan, Denys, and McMullen, Richard F., History of Continental Air Defense Command and Air Defense Command July to December 1955, Directorate of Historical Services, Air Defense Command, Ent AFB, CO, (1956)

Further reading
 Grant, C.L., (1961)  The Development of Continental Air Defense to 1 September 1954, USAF Historical Study No. 126
 

0518
Aerospace Defense Command units
Military units and formations disestablished in 1984
Military units and formations established in 1953